Zvezda  means "star" in some Slavic languages, and may refer to:

Entertainment
 Zvezda (magazine), Russian literary magazine
 Zvezda (TV channel), Russian TV channel
 Star (2014 film), a Russian film
 The Star (1953 film), a Russian film
 The Star (2002 film), a Russian film
 Zvezda (cinema) a squatted cinema in Belgrade
 Zvezda, Serbian literary journal founded and edited by Serbian writer Janko Veselinović

Places
 Lake Zvezda, Antarctica
 Zvezda, Burgas Province, Bulgaria
 Zvezda, Targovishte Province, a village in Targovishte Province, Bulgaria

Space
 Zvezda (ISS module), component of the International Space Station
 Zvezda (moonbase), non-realized Soviet moonbase
 Zvezda spaceplane, a Soviet spaceplane project; see Buran programme#History of the Buran programme
 NPP Zvezda, Russian aeronautical and space manufacturer
 Soyuz 7K-VI Zvezda, non-realized Soviet crewed capsule spacecraft for military goals

Sports
 Zvezda Stadium, a multi-use stadium in Perm, Russia
 FK Crvena zvezda or Red Star Belgrade, a Serbian football club
 FC Zvezda-BGU Minsk, a Belarusian football team
 FC Zvezda Irkutsk, a Russian football team
 FC Zvezda Saint Petersburg, a Russian football team playing in the Professional Football League
 Zvezda-2005 Perm, a women's football team from Perm

Other uses
 Zvezda (company), Russian scale models company
 Zvezda (newspaper), Russian émigré weekly converted into the Bolsheviks' Pravda
 Zvezda (watch), line of Soviet watches produced by the Petrodvorets Watch Factory from 1945 to the late 1960s
 Zvezda M503, diesel engine built in the 1970s by the Soviet Union
 Zvezda shipyard DVZ, large east Russian shipbuilding wharf
 The titular fictional organization in the anime World Conquest Zvezda Plot

See also
Krasnaya Zvezda, the official newspaper of the Russian Ministry of Defence
Zviazda, a newspaper in Belarus
Zvijezda (disambiguation)